Andraste, also known as Andrasta, was, according to the Roman historian Dio Cassius, an Icenic war goddess invoked by Boudica in her fight against the Roman occupation of Britain in AD 60. She may be the same as Andate, mentioned later by the same source, and described as "their name for Victory": i.e., the goddess Victoria. Thayer asserts that she may also be related to Andarta. The goddess Victoria is related to Nike, Bellona, Magna Mater (Great Mother), Cybele, and Vacuna—goddesses who are often depicted on chariots. Her name has been translated as meaning "indestructible" or "unconquerable".

Many neopagan sources describe the hare as sacred to Andraste. This idea seems to be extrapolated from the passage in Dio Cassius in which Boudica releases a hare from her gown:

The hare's release is described as a technique of divination, with an augury drawn from the direction in which it runs. This appears to be similar to the Roman methods of divination which ascribe meaning to the directions from which birds fly, with the left side being unfavourable (sinistra) and the right side favourable.

Popular culture 
The name Andraste is borrowed in the Dragon Age video game series by BioWare to refer to a religious prophet central to the fantasy world's religious practices.

The name is also used for an enemy in the Playstation 3 video game Folklore.

References 
Notes

Bibliography

External links 
 Somewhat speculative page on Andraste and Boudica.

Goddesses of the ancient Britons
War goddesses
Celtic goddesses